This is a list of notable Slovene musicians by instrument. For a list of notable popular Slovenian musical groups and artists see List of Slovenian musical artists and groups.

Accordionists
 Vital Ahačič 
 Slavko Avsenik
 Bratko Bibič
 Luka Juhart
 Denis Novato
 Nejc Pačnik
 Lojze Slak
 Frank Yankovic

Flautists
 Irena Grafenauer 
 Boris Bizjak

Oboists
 Ivo Petrić

Pianists
 Bojan Gorišek
 Marijan Lipovšek 
 Janez Matičič 
 Petar Milić 
 Zoltan Peter 
 Janko Ravnik
 Dubravka Tomšič Srebotnjak

Violinists
 Božena Angelova 
 Volodja Balžalorsky
 Dejan Bravničar 
 Leo Funtek
 Igor Ozim
 Oksana Pečeny
 Lana Trotovšek

Other
 Dejan Knez

Musicians
 
Slovenian